The 1996 Grand Prix de Tennis de Lyon was a men's tennis tournament played on indoor carpet courts at the Palais des Sports de Gerland in Lyon, France, and was part of the World Series of the 1996 ATP Tour. It was the tenth edition of the tournament and was held from 30 September through 6 October 1996. Second-seeded Yevgeny Kafelnikov won the singles title.

Finals

Singles

 Yevgeny Kafelnikov defeated  Arnaud Boetsch 7–5, 6–3
 It was Kafelnikov's 9th singles title of the year and the 24th of his career.

Doubles

 Jim Grabb /  Richey Reneberg defeated  Neil Broad /  Piet Norval 6–2, 6–1
 It was Grabb's 2nd title of the year and the 22nd of his career. It was Reneberg's 2nd title of the year and the 19th of his career.

References

External links
 ITF tournament edition details

Grand Prix de Tennis de Lyon
1996
Grand Prix de Tennis de Lyon